Adir Hu (English: Mighty is He, Hebrew אדיר הוּא) is a hymn sung by Ashkenazi Jews worldwide at the Passover Seder. It switches rapidly between saying the virtues of God in an alphabet format (Aleph, Bet, Gimel,...), and expressing hope that God will "rebuild the Holy Temple speedily." Most of the virtues of God are adjectives (for instance, Holy (Kadosh) is he); however, a few are nouns. (Lord is he). 

Adir Hu is sung towards the end of the Seder. The traditional melody is a bouncy, major one. Other melodies, however, have been composed for the alphabetical song.

History
The tune of Adir Hu has gone through several variations over the years, but its origin is from the German minnesinger period. The earliest existing music for Adir Hu is found in the 1644 "Rittangel Hagada". The second form is found in the 1677 "Hagada Zevach Pesach", and the third and closest form can be found in the 1769 "Selig Hagada". In the 1769 version of the haggadah, the song was also known in German as the "Baugesang" (the song of the rebuilding of the Temple). A traditional German greeting on the night of Passover after leaving the synagogue was "Bau Gut" ("build well"), a reference to Adir Hu.

Text

Variants
Modern variants of the hymn have been written, such as a feminist version by Rabbi Jill Hammer.

See also
 Passover Seder
 Passover

References

External links
 ADIR HU yiddish passover songs rabbi yonatan shtencel
 Hebrew text, transliteration, translation from the Zemirot Database

Passover songs
Hebrew-language songs
Hebrew words and phrases in Jewish prayers and blessings